List of Suzuki motorcycles.

References

Suzuki